The Bactrian Kingdom, known to historians as the Greco-Bactrian Kingdom or simply Greco-Bactria, was a Hellenistic-era Greek state, and along with the Indo-Greek Kingdom, the easternmost part of the Hellenistic world in Central Asia and the Indian Subcontinent from its founding in 256 BC by Diodotus I Soter to its fall  BC under the reign of Heliocles I. It covered much of present-day Afghanistan, Uzbekistan, Tajikistan and Turkmenistan, and at its zenith, parts of Iran and Pakistan. An extension further east with military campaigns may have reached central Gansu province in China. Bactria was ruled by the Diodotid dynasty and rival Euthydemid dynasty. The capitals of Ai-Khanum and Bactra were among the largest and richest of antiquity - Bactria itself was known as the ‘land of a thousand golden cities’. The Indo-Greek Kingdoms, as Bactrian successor states, would last until 10 AD.

History

Independence and Diodotid dynasty

Diodotus, the satrap of Bactria (and probably the surrounding provinces) founded the Greco-Bactrian Kingdom when he seceded from the Seleucid Empire around 250 BC and became King Diodotus I of Bactria. The preserved ancient sources (see below) are somewhat contradictory, and the exact date of Bactrian independence has not been settled. Somewhat simplified, there is a high chronology ( BC) and a low chronology (c. 246 BC) for Diodotos' secession. The high chronology has the advantage of explaining why the Seleucid king Antiochus II issued very few coins in Bactria, as Diodotos would have become independent there early in Antiochus' reign. On the other hand, the low chronology, from the mid-240s BC, has the advantage of connecting the secession of Diodotus I with the Third Syrian War, a catastrophic conflict for the Seleucid Empire.

The new kingdom, highly urbanized and considered one of the richest of the Orient (opulentissimum illud mille urbium Bactrianum imperium "The extremely prosperous Bactrian empire of the thousand cities"), was to further grow in power and engage in territorial expansion to the east and the west:

In 247 BC, the Ptolemaic empire (the Greek rulers of Egypt following the death of Alexander the Great) captured the Seleucid capital, Antioch. In the resulting power vacuum, Andragoras, the Seleucid satrap of Parthia, proclaimed independence from the Seleucids, declaring himself king. A decade later, he was defeated and killed by Arsaces of Parthia, leading to the rise of a Parthian Empire. This cut Bactria off from contact with the Greek world. Overland trade continued at a reduced rate, while sea trade between Greek Egypt and Bactria developed.

Diodotus was succeeded by his son Diodotus II, who allied himself with the Parthian Arsaces in his fight against Seleucus II:

Euthydemid dynasty and Seleucid invasion

Euthydemus, a Greek from Magnesia according to Polybius, and possibly satrap of Sogdiana, overthrew the dynasty of Diodotus II around 230–220 BC and started his own dynasty. Euthydemus's control extended to Sogdiana, going beyond the city of Alexandria Eschate founded by Alexander the Great in Ferghana:

And they also held Sogdiana, situated above Bactriana towards the east between the Oxus River, which forms the boundary between the Bactrians and the Sogdians, and the Iaxartes River. And the Iaxartes forms also the boundary between the Sogdians and the nomads.
 
Euthydemus was attacked by the Seleucid ruler Antiochus III around 210 BC. Although he commanded 10,000 horsemen, Euthydemus initially lost a battle on the Arius and had to retreat. He then successfully resisted a three-year siege in the fortified city of Bactra (modern Balkh), before Antiochus finally decided to recognize the new ruler, and to offer one of his daughters to Euthydemus's son Demetrius around 206 BC. Classical accounts also relate that Euthydemus negotiated peace with Antiochus III by suggesting that he deserved credit for overthrowing the original rebel Diodotus and that he was protecting Central Asia from nomadic invasions thanks to his defensive efforts:

In an inscription found in the Kuliab area of Tajikistan, in eastern Greco-Bactria, and dated to 200–195 BC, a Greek by the name of Heliodotos, dedicating a fire altar to Hestia, mentions Euthydemus as the greatest of all kings, and his son Demetrius I as "Demetrios Kalinikos" "Demetrius the Glorious Conqueror":

Following the departure of the Seleucid army, the Bactrian kingdom seems to have expanded. In the west, areas in north-eastern Iran may have been absorbed, possibly as far as into Parthia, whose ruler had been defeated by Antiochus the Great. These territories possibly are identical with the Bactrian satrapies of Tapuria and Traxiane.

Expansion into the Indian subcontinent (after 180 BC)

Demetrius, the son of Euthydemus, started an invasion of the subcontinent from 180 BC, a few years after the Mauryan empire had been overthrown by the Shunga dynasty. Historians differ on the motivations behind the invasion. Some historians suggest that the invasion of the subcontinent was intended to show their support for the Mauryan empire, and to protect the Buddhist faith from the religious persecutions of the Shungas as alleged by Buddhist scriptures (Tarn). Other historians have argued however that the accounts of these persecutions have been exaggerated (Thapar, Lamotte).

Demetrius may have been as far as the imperial capital Pataliputra in today's eastern India (today Patna). However, these campaigns are typically attributed to Menander. The invasion was completed by 175 BC. This established in the northwestern Indian Subcontinent what is called the Indo-Greek Kingdom, which lasted for almost two centuries until around 10 AD. The Buddhist faith flourished under the Indo-Greek kings, foremost among them Menander I.
It was also a period of great cultural syncretism, exemplified by the development of Greco-Buddhism.

Eucratides
Back in Bactria, Eucratides, either a general of Demetrius or an ally of the Seleucids, managed to overthrow the Euthydemid dynasty and establish his own rule around 170 BC, probably dethroning Antimachus I and Antimachus II. The Indian branch of the Euthydemids tried to strike back. An Indian king called Demetrius (very likely Demetrius II) is said to have returned to Bactria with 60,000 men to oust the usurper, but he apparently was defeated and killed in the encounter:

Eucratides led many wars with great courage, and, while weakened by them, was put under siege by Demetrius, king of the Indians. He made numerous sorties, and managed to vanquish 60,000 enemies with 300 soldiers, and thus liberated after four months, he put India under his rule.

Eucratides campaigned extensively in present-day northwestern India, and ruled a vast territory, as indicated by his minting of coins in many Indian mints, possibly as far as the Jhelum River in Punjab. In the end, however, he was repulsed by the Indo-Greek king Menander I, who managed to create a huge unified territory.
 
In a rather confused account, Justin explains that Eucratides was killed on the field by "his son and joint king", who would be his own son, either Eucratides II or Heliocles I (although there are speculations that it could have been his enemy's son Demetrius II). The son drove over Eucratides' bloodied body with his chariot and left him dismembered without a sepulchre:

As Eucratides returned from India, he was killed on the way back by his son, whom he had associated to his rule, and who, without hiding his parricide, as if he didn't kill a father but an enemy, ran with his chariot over the blood of his father, and ordered the corpse to be left without a sepulture.

Defeats by Parthia
During or after his Indian campaigns, Eucratides was attacked and defeated by the Parthian king Mithridates I, possibly in alliance with partisans of the Euthydemids:

The Bactrians, involved in various wars, lost not only their rule but also their freedom, as, exhausted by their wars against the Sogdians, the Arachotes, the Dranges, the Arians and the Indians, they were finally crushed, as if drawn of all their blood, by an enemy weaker than them, the Parthians.

Following his victory, Mithridates I gained Bactria's territory west of the Arius, the regions of Tapuria and Traxiane: "The satrapy Turiva and that of Aspionus were taken away from Eucratides by the Parthians."

In the year 141 BC, the Greco-Bactrians seem to have entered in an alliance with the Seleucid king Demetrius II to fight again against Parthia:

The people of the Orient welcomed his (Demetrius II's) arrival, partly because of the cruelty of the Arsacid king of the Parthians, partly because, used to the rule of the Macedonians, they disliked the arrogance of this new people. Thus, Demetrius, supported by the Persians, Elymes and Bactrians, routed the Parthians in numerous battles. At the end, deceived by a false peace treaty, he was taken prisoner.

The 5th century historian Orosius reports that Mithridates I managed to occupy territory between the Indus and the Hydaspes towards the end of his reign ( BC, before his kingdom was weakened by his death in 136 BC).

Heliocles I ended up ruling what territory remained. The defeat, both in the west and the east, may have left Bactria very weakened and open to nomadic invasions.

Nomadic invasions

A nomadic steppe people called the Yuezhi inhabited a region thousands of miles to the east of Bactria on the edges of the Han Empire called the Hexi Corridor.  Shortly before 176 BC, the Xiongnu invaded the Hexi Corridor, forcing the Yuezhi to flee the region.  In 162 BC the Yuezhi were driven west to the Ili River valley by the Xiongnu. In 132 they were driven out of the Ili valley by the Wusun. The surviving Yuezhi migrated again south towards the territory just north of the Oxus River where they encountered and expelled a nomadic steppe nation called Sakastan.]]

Around 140 BC, eastern Scythians (the Saka, or Sacaraucae of Greek sources), apparently being pushed forward by the southward migration of the Yuezhi started to invade various parts of Parthia and Bactria. Their invasion of Parthia is well documented: they attacked in the direction of the cities of Merv, Hecatompolis and Ecbatana. They managed to defeat and kill the Parthian king Phraates II, son of Mithridates I, routing the Greek mercenary troops under his command (troops he had acquired during his victory over Antiochus VII). Again in 123 BC, Phraates's successor, his uncle Artabanus I, was killed by the Scythians.

When the Han Chinese diplomat Zhang Qian visited the Yuezhi in 126 BC, trying to obtain their alliance to fight the Xiongnu, he explained that the Yuezhi were settled north of the Oxus but also held under their sway the territory south of Oxus, which makes up the remainder of Bactria.

According to Zhang Qian, the Yuezhi represented a considerable force of between 100,000 and 200,000 mounted archer warriors, with customs identical to those of the Xiongnu, which would probably have easily defeated Greco-Bactrian forces (in 208 BC when the Greco-Bactrian king Euthydemus I confronted the invasion of the Seleucid king Antiochus III the Great, he commanded 10,000 horsemen). Zhang Qian actually visited Bactria (named Daxia in Chinese) in 126 BC, and portrays a country which was totally demoralized and whose political system had vanished, although its urban infrastructure remained:

Daxia (Bactria) is located over 2,000 li southwest of Dayuan, south of the Gui (Oxus) river. Its people cultivate the land and have cities and houses. Their customs are like those of Dayuan. It has no great ruler but only a number of petty chiefs ruling the various cities. The people are poor in the use of arms and afraid of battle, but they are clever at commerce. After the Great Yuezhi moved west and attacked Daxia, the entire country came under their sway. The population of the country is large, numbering some 1,000,000 or more persons. The capital is called the city of Lanshi (Bactra) and has a market where all sorts of goods are bought and sold. (Records of the Great Historian by Sima Qian, quoting Zhang Qian, trans. Burton Watson)

The Yuezhi further expanded southward into Bactria around 120 BC, apparently further pushed out by invasions from the northern Wusun. It seems they also pushed Scythian tribes before them, which continued to India, where they came to be identified as Indo-Scythians.

The invasion is also described in western Classical sources from the 1st century BC:

The best known tribes are those who deprived the Greeks of Bactriana, the Asii, Pasiani, Tochari, and Sacarauli, who came from the country on the other side of the Jaxartes, opposite the Sacae and Sogdiani.)

Around that time the king Heliocles abandoned Bactria and moved his capital to the Kabul valley, from where he ruled his Indian holdings. Having left the Bactrian territory, he is technically the last Greco-Bactrian king, although several of his descendants, moving beyond the Hindu Kush, would form the western part of the Indo-Greek kingdom. The last of these "western" Indo-Greek kings, Hermaeus, would rule until around 70 BC, when the Yuezhi again invaded his territory in the Paropamisadae (while the "eastern" Indo-Greek kings would continue to rule until around AD 10 in the area of the Punjab region).

Overall, the Yuezhi remained in Bactria for more than a century. They became Hellenized to some degree, as suggested by their adoption of the Greek alphabet to write their later Iranian court language, and by numerous remaining coins, minted in the style of the Greco-Bactrian kings, with the text in Greek.

Around 12 BC the Yuezhi then moved further to northern India where they established the Kushan Empire.

Military forces

Before Greek conquest, the armies of Bactria were overwhelmingly composed of cavalry and were well known as effective soldiers, making up large portions of the Achaemenid cavalry contingents. 2,000 Bactrian horsemen fought at the Granicus against Alexander and 9,000 at the Battle of Gaugamela on the left flank of Darius' army. Herodotus also mentions the widespread use of chariots among the Bactrians.  After Alexander's conquest of Bactria, Bactrian cavalry units served in his army during the invasion of India and after the Indian campaign, Alexander enlarged his elite companion cavalry by adding Bactrians, Sogdians and other east Iranian cavalrymen. Both Aeschylus (The Persians, v. 318) and Curtius mention that Bactria was able to field a force of 30,000 horse.  Most of these horsemen were lightly armed, using bows and javelins before closing with sword and spear. Herodotus describes the Persian cavalry of Mardonius at the Battle of Plataea (which included Bactrians) as horse archers (hippotoxotai). Bactrian infantry is described by Herodotus as wearing caps in the Median style, short spears and reed Scythian style bows.

Alexander and Seleucus I both settled other Greeks in Bactria, while preferring to keep their Macedonian settlers farther west. Greek garrisons in the satrapy of Bactria were housed in fortresses called phrouria and at major cities. Military colonists were settled in the countryside and were each given an allotment of land called a kleros. These colonists numbered in the tens of thousands, and were trained in the fashion of the Macedonian army. A Greek army in Bactria during the anti-Macedonian revolt of 323 numbered 23,000.

The army of the Greco-Bactrian kingdom was then a multi-ethnic force with Greek colonists making up large portions of the infantry as pike phalanxes, supported by light infantry units of local Bactrians and mercenary javelin-wielding Thureophoroi. The cavalry arm was very large for a Hellenistic army and composed mostly of native Bactrian, Sogdian and other Indo-Iranian light horsemen. Polybius mentions 10,000 horse at the Battle of the Arius river in 208 BC. Greco-Bactrian armies also included units of heavily armored cataphracts and small elite units of companion cavalry. The third arm of the Greco-Bactrian army was the Indian war elephants, which are depicted in some coins with a tower (thorakion) or howdah housing men armed with bows and javelins. This force grew as the Greco-Bactrian kingdom expanded into India and was widely depicted in Greco-Bactrian coinage. Other units in the Bactrian military included mercenaries or levies from various surrounding peoples such as the Scythians, Dahae, Indians, and Parthians.

Culture and contacts

Greek culture in Bactria

Greeks first began settling the region long before Alexander conquered it. The Persian Empire had a policy of exiling rebelling Greek communities to that region long before it fell to Greek conquest. Therefore, it had a considerable Greek community that was expanded upon after Macedonian conquest.

The Greco-Bactrians were known for their high level of Hellenistic sophistication, and kept regular contact with both the Mediterranean and neighbouring India. They were on friendly terms with India and exchanged ambassadors.

Their cities, such as Ai-Khanoum in northeastern Afghanistan (probably Alexandria on the Oxus), and Bactra (modern Balkh) where Hellenistic remains have been found, demonstrate a sophisticated Hellenistic urban culture. This site gives a snapshot of Greco-Bactrian culture around 145 BC, as the city was burnt to the ground around that date during nomadic invasions and never re-settled. Ai-Khanoum "has all the hallmarks of a Hellenistic city, with a Greek theater, gymnasium and some Greek houses with colonnaded courtyards" (Boardman). Remains of Classical Corinthian columns were found in excavations of the site, as well as various sculptural fragments. In particular a huge foot fragment in excellent Hellenistic style was recovered, which is estimated to have belonged to a 5–6 meter tall statue.

One of the inscriptions in Greek found at Ai-Khanoum, the Herôon of Kineas, has been dated to 300–250 BC, and describes Delphic precepts:

As children, learn good manners.
As young men, learn to control the passions.
In middle age, be just.
In old age, give good advice.
Then die, without regret.

Some of the Greco-Bactrian coins, and those of their successors the Indo-Greeks, are considered the finest examples of Greek numismatic art with "a nice blend of realism and idealization", including the largest coins to be minted in the Hellenistic world: the largest gold coin was minted by Eucratides (reigned 171–145 BC), the largest silver coin by the Indo-Greek king Amyntas Nikator (reigned c. 95–90 BC). The portraits "show a degree of individuality never matched by the often bland depictions of their royal contemporaries further West" (Roger Ling, "Greece and the Hellenistic World").

Several other Greco-Bactrian cities have been further identified, as in Saksanokhur in southern Tajikistan (archaeological searches by a Soviet team under B.A. Litvinski), or in Dal'verzin Tepe.

Takht-i Sangin

Takht-i Sangin (Tajik: "Throne of Stone") is an archaeological site located near the confluence of the Vakhsh and Panj rivers, the source of the Amu Darya, in southern Tajikistan. During the Hellenistic period it was a city of the Greco-Bactrian kingdom with a large temple dedicated to the Oxus (Vakhsh river), which remained in use in the following Kushan period, until the third century AD. The site may have been the source of the Oxus Treasure.

Contacts with the Han Empire

To the north, Euthydemus also ruled Sogdiana and Ferghana, and there are indications that from Alexandria Eschate the Greco-Bactrians may have led expeditions as far as Kashgar and Ürümqi in Xinjiang, leading to the first known contacts between China and the West around 220 BC. The Greek historian Strabo too writes that: "they extended their empire even as far as the Seres (Chinese) and the Phryni". (Strabo, XI.XI.I).

Several statuettes and representations of Greek soldiers have been found north of the Tian Shan, on the doorstep to China, and are today on display in the Xinjiang museum at Ürümqi (Boardman). Middle Eastern or Greek influences on Chinese art have also been suggested (Hirth, Rostovtzeff). Designs with rosette flowers, geometric lines, meanders and glass inlays, suggestive of Egyptian, Persian, and/or Hellenistic influences, can be found on some early Han dynasty bronze mirrors.

Some speculate that Greek influence is found in the artworks of the burial site of China's first Emperor Qin Shi Huang, dating back to the 3rd century BC, including in the manufacture of the famous Terracotta army. This idea suggested that Greek artists may have come to China at that time to train local artisans in making sculptures However, this idea is disputed. 

Numismatics also suggest that some technology exchanges may have occurred on these occasions: the Greco-Bactrians were the first in the world to issue cupro-nickel (75:25 ratio) coins, an alloy technology only known by the Chinese at the time under the name "White copper" (some weapons from the Warring States period were in copper-nickel alloy). The practice of exporting Chinese metals, in particular iron, for trade is attested around that period. Kings Euthydemus, Euthydemus II, Agathocles and Pantaleon made these coin issues around 170 BC. An alternative suggestion is that the metal in the coinage derived from a mine where a cupro-nickel alloy occurred naturally, perhaps Anarak in eastern Iran. Copper-nickel would not be used again in coinage until the 19th century.

The presence of Chinese people in India from ancient times is also suggested by the accounts of the "Ciñas" in the Mahabharata and the Manu Smriti. The Han dynasty explorer and ambassador Zhang Qian visited Bactria in 126 BC, and reported the presence of Chinese products in the Bactrian markets:

"When I was in Bactria (Daxia)", Zhang Qian reported, "I saw bamboo canes from Qiong and cloth made in the province of Shu (territories of southwestern China). When I asked the people how they had gotten such articles, they replied, "Our merchants go buy them in the markets of Shendu (India)." (Shiji 123, Sima Qian, trans. Burton Watson).

The purpose of Zhang Qian's journey was to look for civilizations on the steppe that the Han could ally with against the Xiongnu. Upon his return, Zhang Qian informed the Chinese emperor Han Wudi of the level of sophistication of the urban civilizations of Ferghana, Bactria and Parthia, who became interested in developing commercial relationships with them:

The Son of Heaven on hearing all this reasoned thus: Ferghana (Dayuan) and the possessions of Bactria (Daxia) and Parthia (Anxi) are large countries, full of rare things, with a population living in fixed abodes and given to occupations somewhat identical with those of the Chinese people, and placing great value on the rich produce of China. (Hanshu, Former Han History).

A number of Chinese envoys were then sent to Central Asia, triggering the development of the Silk Road from the end of the 2nd century BC.

Contacts with the Indian subcontinent (250–180 BC)
The Indian emperor Chandragupta, founder of the Mauryan dynasty, conquered the northwestern subcontinent upon the death of Alexander the Great around 323 BC. However, contacts were kept with his Greek neighbours in the Seleucid Empire, a dynastic alliance or the recognition of intermarriage between Greeks and Indians were established (described as an agreement on Epigamia in Ancient sources), and several Greeks, such as the historian Megasthenes, resided at the Mauryan court. Subsequently, each Mauryan emperor had a Greek ambassador at his court.

Chandragupta's grandson Ashoka converted to the Buddhist faith and became a great proselytizer in the line of the traditional Pali canon of Theravada Buddhism, directing his efforts towards the Indo-Iranic and the Hellenistic worlds from around 250 BC. According to the Edicts of Ashoka, set in stone, some of them written in Greek, he sent Buddhist emissaries to the Greek lands in Asia and as far as the Mediterranean. The edicts name each of the rulers of the Hellenistic world at the time.

The conquest by Dharma has been won here, on the borders, and even six hundred yojanas (4,000 miles) away, where the Greek king Antiochos rules, beyond there where the four kings named Ptolemy, Antigonos, Magas and Alexander rule, likewise in the south among the Cholas, the Pandyas, and as far as Tamraparni. (Edicts of Ashoka, 13th Rock Edict, S. Dhammika).

Some of the Greek populations that had remained in northwestern India apparently converted to Buddhism:

Here in the king's domain among the Greeks, the Kambojas, the Nabhakas, the Nabhapamkits, the Bhojas, the Pitinikas, the Andhras and the Palidas, everywhere people are following Beloved-of-the-Gods' instructions in Dharma. (Edicts of Ashoka, 13th Rock Edict, S. Dhammika).

Furthermore, according to Pali sources, some of Ashoka's emissaries were Greek Buddhist monks, indicating close religious exchanges between the two cultures:

(Mahavamsa, XII).

Greco-Bactrians probably received these Buddhist emissaries (at least Maharakkhita, lit. "The Great Saved One", who was "sent to the country of the Yona") and somehow tolerated the Buddhist faith, although little proof remains.  In the 2nd century AD, the Christian dogmatist Clement of Alexandria recognized the existence of Buddhist Sramanas among the Bactrians ("Bactrians" meaning "Oriental Greeks" in that period), and even their influence on Greek thought:

Thus philosophy, a thing of the highest utility, flourished in antiquity among the barbarians, shedding its light over the nations. And afterwards it came to Greece. First in its ranks were the prophets of the Egyptians; and the Chaldeans among the Assyrians; and the Druids among the Gauls; and the Sramanas among the Bactrians (""); and the philosophers of the Celts; and the Magi of the Persians, who foretold the Saviour's birth, and came into the land of Judea guided by a star. The Indian gymnosophists are also in the number, and the other barbarian philosophers. And of these there are two classes, some of them called Sramanas (""), and others Brahmins ("").

Influence on Indian art during the 3rd century BC

The Greco-Bactrian city of Ai-Khanoum, being located at the doorstep of India, interacting with the Indian subcontinent, and having a rich Hellenistic culture, was in a unique position to influence Indian culture as well. It is considered that Ai-Khanoum may have been one of the primary actors in transmitting Western artistic influence to India, for example in the creation of the Pillars of Ashoka or the manufacture of the quasi-Ionic Pataliputra capital, all of which were posterior to the establishment of Ai-Khanoum.

The scope of adoption goes from designs such as the bead and reel pattern, the central flame palmette design and a variety of other moldings, to the lifelike rendering of animal sculpture and the design and function of the Ionic anta capital in the palace of Pataliputra.

First visual representations of Indian deities

One of the last Greco-Bactrian kings, Agathocles of Bactria (ruled 190–180 BC), issued remarkable Indian-standard square coins bearing the first known representations of Indian deities, which have been variously interpreted as Vishnu, Shiva, Vasudeva, Buddha or Balarama. Altogether, six such Indian-standard silver drachmas in the name of Agathocles were discovered at Ai-Khanoum in 1970. These coins seem to be the first known representations of Vedic deities on coins, and they display early Avatars of Vishnu: Balarama-Sankarshana with attributes consisting of the Gada mace and the plow, and Vasudeva-Krishna with the Vishnu attributes of the Shankha (a pear-shaped case or conch) and the Sudarshana Chakra wheel. Some other coins by Agathocles are also thought to represent the Buddhist lion and the Indian goddess Lakshmi, consort of Vishnu. The Indian coinage of Agathocles is few but spectacular. These coins at least demonstrate the readiness of Greek kings to represent deities of foreign origin. The dedication of a Greek envoy to the cult of Garuda at the Heliodorus pillar in Besnagar could also be indicative of some level of religious syncretism.

Main Greco-Bactrian kings

Diodotid dynasty 

 Diodotus I Soter (255–235 BC) First King of Bactria, revolted against Seleucid Empire
 Antiochus I (disputed) son of Diodotus I, ruled Bactria 
 Diodotus II Theos (235–225 BC) son of Diodotus I

Euthydemid takeover (230–171 BC)
Eucratides I the Great (170– BC) Coins most important Greco-Bactrian king, likely a relative of Diodotus I
Eucratides II (145–140 BC) Coins son of Eucratides I to whom he committed patricide 
Diodotus III Platon ( BC) co-ruler of Eucratides (also known by his birth name, Platon/Plato)
Heliocles I (reigned   BC) last king of Bactria before its conquest by the Yuezhi

Euthydemid dynasty

Euthydemus I (reigned  BC)
Demetrius I (r.  BC), invaded and conquered India, establishing the Indo Greek Kingdom.
Euthydemus II (r. 180–171) last Euthydemid ruler of Bactria, killed alongside Demetrius by Eucratides.

Both Euthydemid and Diodotid rulers became kings of Arachosia and India, with the conquests of Demetrius and Eucratides, the Indo-Greek Kingdom was formed. Many of the dates, territories, and relationships between Greco-Bactrian kings are tentative, and essentially based on numismatic analysis and a few Classical sources. The following list of kings, dates and territories after the reign of Demetrius is derived from the latest and most extensive analysis on the subject, by Osmund Bopearachchi (Monnaies Gréco-Bactriennes et Indo-Grecques, Catalogue Raisonné, 1991)

See also
Greco-Buddhism
Seleucid Empire
Indo-Greek Kingdom
Yuezhi
Indo-Scythians
Indo-Parthian Kingdom

Notes

References

Sources
 Boardman, John (1994). The Diffusion of Classical Art in Antiquity. Princeton University Press. .
 Boardman, John, Jasper Griffin, and Oswyn Murray (2001). The Oxford Illustrated History of Greece and the Hellenistic World. Oxford University Press. .
 Bopearachchi, Osmund (1991). Monnaies Gréco-Bactriennes et Indo-Grecques, Catalogue Raisonné. Bibliothèque Nationale de France, .
 Bopearachchi, Osmund and Christine Sachs (2003). De l'Indus à l'Oxus, Archéologie de l'Asie Centrale: catalogue de l'exposition. .
 
 McEvilley, Thomas (2002).The Shape of Ancient Thought. Comparative studies in Greek and Indian Philosophies. Allworth Press and the School of Visual Arts. 
 Puri, B. N. (2000). Buddhism in Central Asia. Motilal Banarsidass, Delhi. .
 Tarn, W. W. (1966) The Greeks in Bactria and India. 2nd Edition. Cambridge University Press.
 Watson, Burton, trans. (1993). Records of the Great Historian. Han dynasty II, by Sima Qian. Columbia University Press. .

External links
 Greco-Bactrian and Indo-Greek Kingdoms in Ancient Texts
 Some new hypotheses on the Greco-Bactrian and Indo-Greek kingdoms by Antoine Simonin
 Catalogue of Greco-Bactrian and Indo-Greek Coins

 
Former monarchies of South Asia
Former monarchies of Central Asia
Lists of monarchs
Former countries in Central Asia
Former countries in South Asia
States and territories established in the 3rd century BC
256 BC
250s BC establishments
3rd-century BC establishments
States and territories disestablished in the 2nd century BC
125 BC
2nd-century BC disestablishments
Former kingdoms